The Whip is a various artists compilation album released in March 1983 by Kamera Records. In 1993 the collection was reissued with an extended track listing as a single-disc and double-disc set. Since its release the album has developed a cult following.

Track listing

Personnel
Adapted from the liner notes of The Whip.

 Ben Addison – cover art, illustrations
 Peter Heur – executive-producer (2001 reissue)
 Connie James – photography
 Judson Leach – mastering (2001 reissue)
 Dean Naleway – executive-producer (2001 reissue)
 Pat Nelson – management
 Dave Roberts – production, compiling, design
 Iggy Vamp – photography (1993 reissue)

Release history

References

External links 
 

1983 compilation albums
Cleopatra Records compilation albums
Jungle Records compilation albums